Changpu Town is a town and the county seat of Suining County in Hunan, China. The town was formed in 1954, it is located in the south eastern part of the county. It has 2 villages and 6 communities under its jurisdiction.

References

Suining, Hunan
County seats in Hunan